Indumati or Indumathi may refer to

Indumati Bhattacharya, Indian politician.
Indumati Chimanlal Sheth, Indian politician and educationist.
Indumati Gopinathan, Indian pathologist.
Indumati Babuji Patankar, Indian activist
Indumathi Kathiresan, Indian football player

Indian feminine given names